is a Japanese four-panel manga parody series by Izumo Itō, serialized in Houbunsha's seinen manga magazine Manga Time Kirara Carat since 2014. It has been collected in six tankōbon volumes.

An anime television series adaptation produced by J.C.Staff aired between July and September 2019. A second season aired between April and July 2022.

Plot
One day, Yuko Yoshida wakes up with horns and a tail and learns that she is the descendant of the Dark Clan that was cursed into poverty by the opposing Light Clan. In order to restore her clan's honor, she is tasked with defeating the town's local magical girl, Momo Chiyoda.

Characters
 

A high school girl who one day awakens as a demon girl, tasked with defeating a magical girl. Her full demon girl title is "Shadow Mistress Yuko", often shortened into "Shamiko". Despite her ancestry, she is physically weak. In times of danger, she can transform into a Crisis Management form which slightly improves her abilities. As a succubus, she is capable to entering people's dreams while sleeping. She later inherits her father's wand, the "Whatchamacallit Rod", which can take the form of anything Yuko can envision as a stick or a weapon. 

A magical girl who attends Yuko's high school. Despite allegedly being among the weakest among her fellow magical girls, she possesses great physical strength even without transforming.

Yuko's ancestor, nicknamed Shamicen. She appears in Yuko's dreams and can receive offerings given to a statue that Yuko carries around. When a switch on the statue is flipped, she can take control of Yuko's body.  She can also possess vessels that Momo creates, one of which is later enhanced with immortality by the Great White Snake so she can run errands for him.

A magical girl who came to the city to assist Momo, later transferring to Yuko's school to protect her. She is afflicted by a curse that causes others to experience calamities whenever she gets flustered, which is later revealed to be caused by the guardian Ugallu in an attempt to protect her.

 
Yuko's friend and classmate who works at a butcher.

Yuko's friend and classmate who loves the occult and is a member of the school's Black Magic Studies Club.

Yuko's younger sister who is in middle school. Despite not being a demon girl like Yuko, she strives to help her sister in any way she can.

Yuko and Ryoko's mother, who always takes everything with a smile, regardless of how bizarre it is.

Yuko and Ryoko's father, who also goes under the alias . He also has a youthful appearance. He was sealed away inside a cardboard box by Sakura.

Momo's elder adoptive-sister, who was the city's magical girl before her. She disappeared ten years ago after manipulating the seal on Yuko's family to ensure her good health.

A Huli jing fox who works under Shirosawa as a waitress at the Asura coffee shop. She has a crush on Shirosawa and has a habit of using magical leaves to bewitch people that eat her food.

A demon tapir (Hakutaku) who runs the Asura coffee shop. He also created the shopping district's mascot character,  after being inspired of Sakura's cat form.

Mikan's familiar, whose name comes from Ugallu. Originally intended to be a guardian to ward off evil from inside, the influence of Mikan's powerful magic led her to attack anyone that made her heart pound, leading to the so-called curse. With Yuko and Momo's help, she is separated from Mikan's body.

Media

Manga
The manga series began serialization in Houbunsha's Manga Time Kirara Carat magazine in July 2014; it has been compiled into six tankōbon volumes as of February 2021. Seven Seas Entertainment have licensed the series and will release it in digital and physical form.

Anime
An anime television series adaptation was announced in the March issue of Manga Time Kirara Carat on January 28, 2019. The series is animated by J.C.Staff and directed by Hiroaki Sakurai, with Keiichirō Ōchi handling series composition, Mai Otsuka designing the characters, and Miki Sakurai composing the music. The series aired on TBS and BS-TBS between July 12 and September 27, 2019. The opening theme song is "Machikado Tangent" performed by Shami Momo (Konomi Kohara and Akari Kitō), while the ending theme song is "Yoimachi Cantare" performed by Coro Machikado (Kohara, Kitō, Minami Takahashi, and Tomoyo Takayanagi). The series is licensed in English-speaking regions by Sentai Filmworks, who streamed the series on HiDive.

A second season titled The Demon Girl Next Door 2-Chōme has been announced. The main staff and cast members are returning to reprise their roles. It aired from April 8 to July 1, 2022, on TBS and BS11. The opening theme song is "Tokimeki Rendezvous" performed by Shami Momo, while the ending theme song is "Yoikagen Tetragon" performed by Coro Machikado.

Episode list

Season 1

Season 2

Video games
In 2019, characters from the series appear alongside other Manga Time Kirara characters in the mobile RPG, Kirara Fantasia. In 2020, characters and songs from the series appeared in collaboration with Pony Canyon's mobile music game Re:Stage! Prism Step and Sega's arcade music game Ongeki.

Reception
Gadget Tsūshin listed "Crisis Management!" and "Shamiko is a bad girl" in their 2019 anime buzzwords list. Lynzee Loveridge and Kim Morrissy stated that the latter is technically a misquotation in spite of Momo's attitude towards Shamiko.

Notes

References

External links
  
 

2019 anime television series debuts
Anime series based on manga
Comedy anime and manga
Demons in anime and manga
Houbunsha manga
J.C.Staff
Magical girl anime and manga
Seinen manga
Sentai Filmworks
Seven Seas Entertainment titles
Slice of life anime and manga
Supernatural anime and manga
TBS Television (Japan) original programming
Yonkoma